The Notre Dame Fighting Irish women's lacrosse team is an NCAA Division I college lacrosse team representing the University of Notre Dame as part of the Atlantic Coast Conference. They play their home games at Arlotta Family Lacrosse Stadium in Notre Dame, Indiana.

Individual career records

Reference:

Individual single-season records

Seasons
Reference:

Postseason Results

The Fighting Irish have appeared in 13 NCAA tournaments. Their postseason record is 7–13.

References

Notre Dame Fighting Irish
Atlantic Coast Conference women's lacrosse
Sports clubs established in 1997
1997 establishments in Indiana